The tennis competitions at the 1971 Mediterranean Games took place in İzmir.Athletes competed in 2 events. Tennis was one of several sports during the sixth Mediterranean Games held in Izmir in Turkey in the period 6 to 17 October 1971. It was the third time that tennis was on the program during the Mediterranean Games. There was a men's singles and doubles tournament.

Medal table

Medalists

References

External links
 Complete 1971 Mediterranean Games Standings

Sports at the 1971 Mediterranean Games
1971
Mediterranean Games